Romana Panić (born 9 April 1975), better known just as Romana, is a Serbian singer. Arguably best known for her song "Samoodbrana", she saw most success in the early 2000s. Romana also took victory at the 2004 Sunčane Skale music festival in Herceg Novi, Montenegro. 

Additionally, she was a contestant on the fifth season of reality TV show Farma (2013), finishing in fifth place.

In June 2020, Panić was arrested in Brisbane, Australia for committing a credit card fraud and was sentenced to twelve months in prison.

Discography
Studio albums
Lažem (1999)
Venera (2001)
Ne! (2004)
Dragi (2009)
Krećem (2011)

References

External links
 

Living people
1975 births
Musicians from Banja Luka
Serbs of Bosnia and Herzegovina
21st-century Serbian women singers
Serbian folk-pop singers
Beovizija contestants